Christopher Gauker is an American philosopher and Professor of Philosophy at the University of Salzburg. He is known for his works on philosophy of language.

Life
Gauker grew up in Bloomington, Minnesota and attended the University of Chicago, where Donald Davidson directed his bachelor's thesis. He received his doctoral degree from the University of Pittsburgh, where Wilfrid Sellars directed his dissertation. Before coming to Salzburg, he was a professor at the University of Cincinnati.

Books
 Words and Images: An Essay on the Origin of Ideas, Oxford University Press, 2011
 Conditionals in Context, MIT Press, 2005
 Words without Meaning, MIT Press, 2003
 Thinking Out Loud: An Essay on the Relation between Thought and Language, Princeton University Press, 1994

See also
Meaning (philosophy of language)
Meaning (linguistics)

References

External links
 Personal website

Philosophers of language
Philosophy academics
Living people
Year of birth missing (living people)
Academic staff of the University of Salzburg
University of Cincinnati faculty
University of Pittsburgh alumni
Philosophers of mind
Philosophers of logic
University of Chicago alumni
21st-century American philosophers